James Brown was a Scottish footballer. His regular position was as a defender. He played for Manchester United, Dundee Our Boys, and Dundee.

External links
MUFCInfo.com profile

Scottish footballers
Dundee F.C. players
Manchester United F.C. players
Year of birth unknown
Year of death unknown
Association football defenders
19th-century births